Prendergast may refer to:

 Prendergast (surname), including a list of people with the name
 Prendergast, Pembrokeshire, a suburb of Haverfordwest, Pembrokeshire, Wales
 Prendergast (Solva, Haverfordwest), a location in Wales
 Prendergast School, Lewisham, London, UK

Other uses

 Archbishop Prendergast High School, a former school in Philadelphia, U.S